Canada competed at the 2014 Winter Olympics in Sochi, Russia, from February 7 to 23, 2014. Canadians competed in every discipline except Nordic combined.

The 2014 Games marked the first time a Canadian Olympic team competed in Russia, as Canada and 64 western countries did not take part at the 1980 Summer Olympics held in Moscow due to the Soviet–Afghan War.

The youngest athlete in Canada's delegation was figure skater Gabrielle Daleman, who turned 16 in January, while curler Jennifer Jones was the oldest athlete at 39.

Canada originally finished these Olympics with 10 gold medals and 25 overall (ranking 2nd and 3rd respectively). This is the second most successful Canadian performance ever, exceeded only by the achievements at the home Olympics in Vancouver in 2010. With the belated luge medal awarded in 2017 after a Russian doping disqualification, Canada briefly tied its Vancouver performance in total medal count. However, the IOC decision was overturned on appeal, bumping the Canadian team back to fourth and the total medal count back to 2nd and 3rd.

History
On Day 1 of the Games, three athletes won the nation's first medals. Canada's first medalist was Mark McMorris, who won a bronze in the slopestyle snowboarding event. Justine Dufour-Lapointe won the first gold medal in freestyle skiing (women's moguls) and her sister, Chloé Dufour-Lapointe, finished in second place in the same event, earning the country's first silver medal.

At 19 years 321 days, Justine Dufour-Lapointe became the youngest freestyle skiing Olympic gold medalist. Justine and Chloé, became the third pair of sisters to finish 1–2 in an event at the Winter Games. Their elder sister, Maxime, finished 12th in the same event. It was the fifth time three siblings have competed at the same event at the Winter Games.

On February 10, Alexandre Bilodeau became the first freestyle skiing gold medalist to defend his Olympic title, and first repeat gold medalist, winning the men's moguls. He became the first Canadian to defend their Olympic gold since Catriona Le May Doan repeated her gold at the 2002 Salt Lake City Olympics. Le May Doan had been the first Canadian to repeat gold, Bilodeau becoming the second to do so, and the first man.

Medalists

Competitors

Alpine skiing

According to the final quota allocation released on January 26, 2014, Canada has fifteen athletes in qualification position.

The first three men who have qualified were formally announced on January 8, 2014. and the first three women were formally announced on January 16, 2014. The final nine members of the team were named on January 27, 2013.

Men

Women

Biathlon

Canada has officially qualified 5 women and 5 men after finishing 13th in the 2012 and 2013 Biathlon World Championships for both sexes.  However, only 8 athletes were to be selected. The team was unveiled on January 2, 2014.

Men

Women

Mixed

Bobsleigh

The qualification is based on the world rankings as of January 20, 2014.

On December 16, 2013, the following athletes were named to the Canadian Olympic team.

Men

* – Denotes the driver of each sled
** – According to run results Cody Sorensen and Ben Coakwell were replaced in run 3 by Luke Demetre and Graeme Rinholm.

Women

* – Denotes the driver of each sled

Cross-country skiing

Cross Country Ski Canada formally announced the athletes for Sochi on January 14. Brittany Webster and Amanda Ammar were added to the team on January 24, 2014.

Distance
Men

Women

Sprint
Men

Women

Curling

Based on results from 2012 World Women's Curling Championship and the 2013 World Women's Curling Championship, Canada has qualified their men's and women's teams as one of the seven highest ranked nations. The men's and women's teams were selected through the Olympic Curling Trials held in Winnipeg from December 1 to 8 in 2013.

Men's tournament

 Brad Jacobs
 Ryan Fry
 E. J. Harnden
 Ryan Harnden
 Caleb Flaxey

Round-robin
Canada has a bye in draws 4, 8 and 12.

Draw 1
Monday, February 10, 9:00 am

Draw 2
Monday, February 10, 7:00 pm

Draw 3
Tuesday, February 11, 2:00 pm

Draw 5
Wednesday, February 12, 7:00 pm

Draw 6
Thursday, February 13, 2:00 pm

Draw 7
Friday, February 14, 9:00 am

Draw 9
Saturday, February 15, 2:00 pm

Draw 10
Sunday, February 16, 9:00 am

Draw 11
Sunday, February 16, 7:00 pm

Semifinal
Wednesday, February 19, 7:00 pm

Final
Friday, February 21, 5:30 pm

Women's tournament

 Jennifer Jones
 Kaitlyn Lawes
 Jill Officer
 Dawn McEwen
 Kirsten Wall

Round-robin
Canada has a bye in draws 3, 7 and 11.

Draw 1
Monday, February 10, 2:00 pm

Draw 2
Tuesday, February 11, 9:00 am

Draw 4
Wednesday, February 12, 2:00 pm

Draw 5
Thursday, February 13, 9:00 am

Draw 6
Thursday, February 13, 7:00 pm

Draw 8
Saturday, February 15, 9:00 am

Draw 9
Saturday, February 15, 7:00 pm

Draw 10
Sunday, February 16, 2:00 pm

Draw 12
Monday, February 17, 7:00 pm

Semifinals
Wednesday, February 19, 2:00 pm

Final
Thursday, February 20, 5:30 pm

Figure skating

Canada has achieved the following quota places with their results at the 2013 World Figure Skating Championships:

Team trophy

Freestyle skiing

9 provisional spots were already filled by the Canadian Freestyle Ski Association. The remainder of the team besides ski cross was announced on January 20, 2014. The remainder of the ski cross team will be announced on January 27. Due to the depth of the Canadian team many athletes ranked high up will not get the chance to go, because of the quota limit of 26. This also meant Canada would not send any women in the aerials event, in which it won two medals in 2002. Megan Gunning was named to the team in ski halfpipe but she was injured preparing for the Winter X Games XVIII, moguls skier Philippe Marquis was named to the team in her place on January 23, 2014. The members of the ski cross team were named on January 27, 2014, to complete the freestyle skiing team.

Aerials

Halfpipe

Moguls

Ski cross

Qualification legend: FA – Qualify to medal round; FB – Qualify to consolation round

Slopestyle

Ice hockey

Men's tournament

Canada qualified a men's team by being one of the 9 highest ranked teams in the IIHF World Ranking following the 2012 World Championships.

Group stage

Quarterfinals

Semifinals

Gold medal game

Women's tournament

The women's team qualified by being one of the 5 highest ranked teams in the IIHF World Ranking following the 2012 Women's World Championships.

On December 23 the roster was announced.

Group stage

Semifinals

Gold medal game

Luge

Based on world rankings between November 1, 2013, and December 31, 2013, Canada has qualified 3 men, 3 women, 1 doubles team, and a relay team.

On December 17, 2013, Canada nominated athletes for all but one spot on the women's roster to the Olympic team. The final spot on the women's roster was decided by a race off which was won by Arianne Jones and she was added to the team on December 23, 2013.

Men

Women

Mixed team relay

Short track speed skating

Canada qualified five skaters of each gender for the Olympics during World Cup 3 and 4 in November 2013. They qualified the maximum number of starting places with 3 for each gender in each distance (500, 1000 and 1500 m) and both a men's and women's relay team.

The team of 10 was nominated for the Games on August 29, 2013, and which skaters were competing in each individual distances was announced on January 14. Jessica Gregg was the 5th woman to qualify for the team but she did not skate in any individual distances or in the relay.

Men

Women

Qualification legend: ADV – Advanced due to being impeded by another skater; FA – Qualify to medal round; FB – Qualify to consolation round

Skeleton

Canada announced the four athletes for Sochi in December 2013.

Ski Jumping

The ski jumping team was named on January 26, 2014, in Vancouver. Alexandra Pretorius later withdrew due to injury and was not replaced.

Men

Women

Snowboarding

Canada pre-qualified six athletes in late October for snowboarding at the 2014 Games in Sochi. The full roster was announced on January 21, 2014.

Alpine
Men

Women

Freestyle
Men

Qualification Legend: QF – Qualify directly to final; QS – Qualify to semifinal

Women

Qualification Legend: QF – Qualify directly to final; QS – Qualify to semifinal

Snowboard cross

Qualification legend: FA – Qualify to medal round; FB – Qualify to consolation round

Speed skating

The members of the team were decided following the Olympic Selections and Canadian Single Distances Championships held December 28 – January 3.
The team was named on January 22, 2014:

Men

Women

Team pursuit

See also

 Canada at the 2014 Winter Paralympics
 Canada at the 2014 Commonwealth Games
 Canada at the 2014 Summer Youth Olympics

References

External links

 
 

Nations at the 2014 Winter Olympics
2014
Winter Olympics